Cherokee War may refer to any of the following 18th- and 19th-century North American conflicts:
Anglo-Cherokee War (1758-1761), or First Cherokee War
Cherokee War of 1776, or Second Cherokee War
Cherokee–American wars of 1776-1794
Cherokee removal (1836-39), or "Trail of Tears"
Texan Cherokee War (1838-39), part of the Texas–Indian wars